Seth James Sorenson is a character in Brandon Mull's fantasy series, Fablehaven.

In the Books 
Seth, due to his curious, out-going nature, often has to learn everything the hard way.  Though formidable even as an individual, he and Kendra, working together, were unstoppable.  Like Kendra, he has this really strange knack for managing to stay alive in the trickiest situations, even though he is often mortally wounded, and never gives up.  Unlike his sister though, Seth's main trait is courage.  Throughout the series, Seth and his sister learn lessons unique to each individual.

Fablehaven: Rise of the Evening Star
In book 2, Seth goes into a funeral home and gets bit by a statue of Olloch the Glutton causing the demon to awake and eventually grow strong enough and big enough to pursue Seth in order to eat him.   Olloch devours him eventually but he survived in an impervious fairy cocoon given to him by Coulter.  Seth takes a powerful courage potion and confronts the Revenant.  He is successful in removing the cursed nail from the Revenant, defeating it.  This allowed Kendra and Warren to pass through the revenant's territory and enter the tower.  In the confrontation, Seth becomes immune to magical fear that some dark beings radiate.  He also gained the ability to see some elements of darkness that are hidden to others.

Fablehaven: Grip of the Shadow Plague
Seth visits the demon Graulus who appears in the third book and learns that Navarog, the dragon prince, was the one released from the Quiet Box, and that he retrieved the talismanic nail Seth had removed from the Revenant, and gave it to the demon Kurisock. Meanwhile, in Lost Mesa, Kendra finds the key to another hidden preserve. Seth successfully retrieves the Chronometer and inadvertently brings Patton Burgess to the present time.  Seth, Kendra and Patton then face the final battle to defeat the Shadow Plague.

Fablehaven: Secrets of the Dragon Sanctuary
Seth gets into more trouble by stealing the first horn of a unicorn from the centaurs, their most prized possession (aka the soul of Grunhold/Ring of Stones). He finds out he is a Shadow Charmer, and many are not sure if they should trust him because Shadow Charmers are usually the villains.  He is then denied from the group journeying to the dragon sanctuary Wyrmroost because of his age, (and his possible dark attributes) but that won't stop him from going. Seth sneaks into the knapsack that his sister received that holds an extra dimension. He makes friends with a giant and other creatures of the night. While at Wyrmroost Seth and his sister Kendra find out that together they could be a dragon tamer. They together slay Siletta, a poisonous salamander-like dragon, whose entire body consists of deadly poison, and many other monsters. Even after Wyrmroost, Seth is still able to laugh.

Fablehaven: Keys to the Demon Prison
Seth on a mission to get the Translocator is captured by the Sphinx's force. The Sphinx feeling that Seth has been taken out of action permanently tells Seth about his own plans for Seth's family and allies after their defeat, his rise to power and offers to guide Seth in learning to use his powers as a shadow charmer. Seth also learns that he is in the Living Mirage, the last secret preserves and that The Sphinx is the caretaker. Seth refuses The Sphinx's offer of apprenticeship but only after learning all that he can about the Sphinx's plans. He is then placed into prison where he quickly meets Bracken the Unicorn and they quickly become allies. In a plot to betray the Sphinx, Mirav following instructions from Nani Luna secretly gives Seth The Translocator and The Sands of Sanctity. Unaware of the plot Seth quickly leaves using The Translocator with The Sands of Sanctity and travels back to Fablehaven. Then with The Translocator and The Sands of Sanctity Seth under the impression he is just reliving the pain of death uses The Sands of Sanctity to heal the demon Graulas to fulfill he promise to the demon. Graulas quickly overpowers Seth and reveals the successful plot to Seth. He then steals two of the artifacts from him and quickly overpowers Fablehaven's magic. Graulas kills Coulter in securing his third artifact, The Chronometer then leaves using The Translocator. Before dying Coulter speaks with Patton Burgess by using The Chronometer allowing Patton to make preparations for Seth in the past. In the last minutes of his life Coulter tells Seth about his conversation with Patton allowing Seth to find a message from Patton in the old manor. The message contains Patton's plan for Seth to arm himself and get to the Shoreless Isle to make a last stand against the demons. The message tells Seth to first find a leprechaun that Patton left two items that allowing travel to the Shoreless Isle, then go to The Singing Sisters in Mississippi so they can give him information to finding Vasilis, one of the 7 strongest swords in exitance. Seth then releases the narcoblix Vanessa and barters with Dorin and Newel for help. Together Vanessa, Seth, Newel, Dorin, and Hugo complete Patton's plan. Along the way Seth barters with the Singing Sisters alone and promises to give a wraith, give Vasilis one year after the recovering it, and a promise to complete on impossible task in the future in exchange the information and if he fails to do any of these tasks he will be killed by a magic knife. After completing Patton's plan Seth's group meet up with Kendra and her allies and travel together according to Patton's plan to the Shoreless Isle. When the prison is opened less than a day after Seth arrives on The Shoreless Isle and all of the demons are released Seth kills Graulas and Nagi Luna single-handedly. Fatally injured Seth gives his Vasilis to Kendra then is healed by The Sands of Sanctity. Kendra then uses Vasilis to kill the Demon King Gorgrog. Seth relaxes after the Battle of Zzyzx in won and doesn't help much in the restoration of order in the reserves.

Powers and Abilities 
Seth is a Shadow Charmer, his qualities beginning to emerge in Rise of the Evening Star and being stabilized and brought to full potency in Secrets of the Dragon Sanctuary. While most of his family and friends are alienated by the dark origin of his powers, Seth has never used his abilities for evil.  Being a shadow charmer and an ally of night, most of his family didn't have much trust in him.  It seems to be that in their opinions, Seth's accomplishments weren't as significant as Kendra's, perhaps because of the dark elements that always surrounded them.
 Seth is immune to magical manipulation of emotion, from magical fear to the guilt of stealing a unicorn horn.
 Seth can perceive dark elements invisible to others. 
 Seth can speak and understand the languages of darkness, from demons to trolls.
 Seth can shade walk, meaning that away from bright light he is nearly invisible.
 Seth is trusted more by dark creatures than other humans, being an ally of the night, although the degree to which this is effective varies from creature to creature, demons in particular being immune to him, although he easily befriends the sky giant Thronis and the mountain troll Under
 Seth has a link to undead creatures, being able to hear their minds and they his (most of the time). The Sphinx (another shadow charmer) has explained that "[You and I] are a link to life, and they will do anything to preserve that link." This makes it easier for Seth to control undead creatures.
 Seth, in combination with Kendra, is a humorous dragon tamer, due to his ability to not feel magical fear and be paralyzed.
 Many of Seth's abilities are never used nor discovered in the series. The Sphinx, a more advanced shadow charmer, is able to plunge a room into darkness, release dizzy spells, and lower the temperature in the same room.

Film
A Fablehaven film has been confirmed, yet we do not know who will play Seth.

Fablehaven series